is a Japanese manufacturer of plastic model kits, radio-controlled cars, battery and solar powered educational models, sailboat models, acrylic and enamel model paints, and various modeling tools and supplies. The company was founded by Yoshio Tamiya in Shizuoka, Japan, in 1946.

The company has gained a reputation among hobbyists of producing models of outstanding quality and accurate scale detail. The company's philosophy is reflected directly in its motto: "First in quality around the world". Tamiya's metal molds are produced from plans with the concept of being "easy to understand and build, even for beginners". Even the box art is consistent with this throughout the company. Tamiya has been awarded the Modell des Jahres (Model of the Year) award, hosted by the German magazine ModellFan.

Products currently commercialized by Tamiya include (toy and collectibles): scale plastic model cars, aircraft, military vehicles, motorcycles, figurines, radio-controlled cars, trucks, and tanks. Tamiya also produces materials and tools, including enamel paints, acrylic paints, airbrushes, aerosol paint, and marker pens.

History

Entrance of plastic models 
The company was founded in 1946 as Tamiya Shoji & Co. (Tamiya Commerce Company) by Yoshio Tamiya  (15 May 1905 – 2 November 1988) in Oshika, Shizuoka City. It was a sawmill and lumber supply company. With the high availability of wood, the timber company's wood products division (founded in 1947) also produced wooden models of ships and airplanes, which later became company's foundation. In 1953, the company stopped selling architectural lumber and focused solely on model making.

In the mid-1950s, wooden model sales were decreased due to foreign-made plastic models starting to be imported. This led the company to also manufacture plastic models, starting in 1959. Their first model was the Japanese battleship Yamato. Tamiya's competitors already sold similar models for 350 yen, forcing the company to match the price. However, at this cheap price, Tamiya was unable to recover the cost of producing metal molds, so once again, they refocused on wooden models.

In the 1960s, using metal molds no longer needed for plastic toys, Tamiya was able to release a racecar mini-kit, which financed the production of their next plastic model. To their good fortune, it became a hit. They decided their second plastic model would be the Panther tank—it had a linear form, which would make the molds simple to produce. They commissioned illustrator Shigeru Komatsuzaki  to do the box art. The Panther was motorized, moved well, and had a clear instruction manual, which made it easy to assemble, all of which gained it a good reputation. The model was made in a 1:35 scale—later to become a standard scale modelling scale for military subjects—because it was decided that the tank would use a single Type 2 battery (but would hold two of them).

Metal molds 
Tamiya is known for the extremely high accuracy of their molds, which is reflected in the final product after assembly. For example, in the past, when Tamiya manufactured plastic models using craftsmen's skills and earlier designs, other companies' products represented bolts as simple hemispheric protuberances while Tamiya represented bolts more accurately as hexagonal posts. This level of detail and thoroughness with which they produced their models earned them a high reputation, even overseas.

Initially, Tamiya ordered metal molds from outside contractors, but often had delays and unclear pricing, which led to trouble. Then, they scouted metal-mold craftsmen into the company and in 1964 started their own Metal Molds division. Starting in 1966, they transferred a number of craftsmen to the Mold Manufacturing Factory. These craftsmen slowly gained the know-how and came to make molds for Tamiya. Today, computer-aided design (CAD) is also used in the development process.

Packaging 
On early products (1961–1967), the box art was done by outsourced illustrators, including Shigeru Komatsuzaki. This box art, which expanded the product image and had a feeling of "compositions of achievement" or "a story contained in a picture", further enhanced Tamiya's brand.

However, in an attempt to make the box art more accurate and visually precise, the 1968 slot racing car model appeared without scenery on a white background. This experiment turned out to be popular, and after that, Tamiya completely switched to white packaging (except for some aircraft and ship models). Shigeru Komatsuzaki's box art, which had contributed to Tamiya's early image, has now almost disappeared from Tamiya's products due to the change in box art strategies and the discontinuation of former products.

In the 1970s, some box art of model tanks contained images of items not included in the box. When Tamiya began exporting these models internationally, false advertising laws became problematic. Tamiya dealt with this by erasing the items and retouching the backgrounds.

Timeline 
1960 – 1:800 battleship Yamato, Tamiya's first plastic model. Due to the poor sales, Tamiya diverted the product to battleship Musashi.
1961 – 1:35 Panther tank, Tamiya's first tank model. Tamiya's famous 1:35 scale originates in the size of this motorized model (using two C batteries), which was 1:35 of the actual Panther tank by chance.
1964 – Tamiya established an in-house mold and die department.
1966 – Shunsaku Tamiya visited the United States Army Ordnance Museum for the first time for covering the tanks. The coverage result at this time became Tamiya's early underlying data for tank models. After this visit, Tamiya came to cover actual vehicles eagerly in the tank museums around the world, including the Bovington Tank Museum. While visiting the Aberdeen Tank Museum, Maryland, since no pictures or sketches of the classified tanks were permitted, Tamiya employees sketched all they could remember as soon as they left the grounds.
1967 – 1:12 Honda F-1; completed with the cooperation of Honda. The next year, this model was shown at the Nuremberg Toy Fair in Germany where Tamiya became the first Japanese model kit manufacturer to exhibit.
1968 – 1:35 German Tank Soldier Set; the first product in the Military Miniature Series.
1976 – 1:12 Porsche 934 Turbo RSR. Tamiya actually purchased a real Porsche 911, dismantled it, and rebuilt it in order to better understand the car. Tamiya diverted the die to make a radio-controlled car (RC car) version of the Porsche 934. Although sale of the plastic model of the 1:12 Porsche 934 was poor, the RC car version was a great success. In 2006, Tamiya choose the 934 Turbo RSR as the product to commemorate the 30th anniversary of Tamiya's RC car series.
1980s – Tamiya introduced programmable logic controllers for moving models. These used a 4-bit microcontroller.
1986 – Hotshot Jr.; the first in the popular Racer Mini 4WD series.

Trademark
On the release of Tamiya's first plastic model, Shunsaku Tamiya (son of founder Yoshiro Tamiya) commissioned his younger brother, Masao, then a first-year student at Tokyo National University of Fine Arts and Music Design Department, to create a new trademark. He created the logo called the "Star Mark". At first, it was decorated with English. In 1960, with the release of the slot car, the design was changed to its current form. The left red star stands for creativity and passion, and the right blue star stands for youth and sincerity.

Mascot 
Between 1984 and 1989, Tamiya had its own mascot called Plastic Model Moko-chan, who has a rabbit sidekick called . Together, they were sometimes titled . Drawn by manga artist Fujita Yukihisa, they usually appeared in various Japanese language pamphlets and in comics with Japan-released Tamiya models. They would teach kids about the various models they were building. There was even a series on how to build them, all in a comic format, as well as its only bilingual series of leaflets titled , teaching children RC car care and maintenance.

Although Tamiya no longer uses these characters, they still have a large following with devotees. Nowadays, in the instructions of some plastic 1:35 scale tanks, a tank crewman usually gives tips.

Publications
Tamiya News has been published by Tamiya Model and is an informational, monthly publication about the company's own models. Started in 1967, it was published bimonthly with an occasional special supplement. For a long time, it cost 50 yen, but was later raised to 100 yen. The unique, thin publications were placed in envelopes and sent out via standard mail. Introductory articles on new products, model shops, model clubs, and conversions were included, as well as articles on famous and obscure modelers. A sister publication with articles focused on miniature vehicles and bullet racers, Tamiya Junior News, exists as a free publication (formerly costing 20 yen, but now is available for download as a PDF from Tamiya's website).

Other model-related publications held doll-conversion contests or scenic photo contests, and then they published the results in booklets. In the UK in 1985, Tamiya Model Magazine was launched. It was published initially as a quarterly title, then bimonthly, and finally monthly, as it remains now. The magazine is produced by British publisher Doolittle Media. It promotes new and existing Tamiya products, but also includes the model products from other manufacturers.

Product lines

Representative models
The early Military Miniature Series differed from the western standard scales of the time and used 1:35 scale. The models had the option for the inclusion of batteries and a gear box for motorization. These models were easy to assemble, looked good after assembly, and had accurate parts. These qualities gave the series a good reputation since its release. However, the option for motorization meant that the models needed to be inaccurate in some respects in order to work as motorized kits. More scale-accurate products which did not allow for motorization were renewed after the Tiger I's later model.

After that, Tamiya's family of products was seen world-wide. Noticing other companies were imitating their ease of assembly and accuracy of parts, Tamiya went a step further and added deformities in order to make the finished models look more realistic. However, some modelers felt these deformities were out of place.

In 2004, the new 1:48 scale series began, and World War items were released at a remarkable pace.

A small-scale 1:700 Water Line Series proudly displayed Tamiya's skill. There are many kits in this series. Kihachiro Ueda handled most of the box art for the Water Line Series. It includes:

Sports Car Series
Grand Prix Series
Motorcycle Series
Mini-jet Series (after 2004, this was re-released as the Combat Plane Series)
Warbird Collection

Main remote-control products

Cars

In 1976, Tamiya entered the RC market with their first RC model, the Porsche 934 Turbo RSR. Today, these models are sold both in Japan and worldwide. To commemorate the 30th Anniversary of this first Tamiya RC model, Tamiya re-released a limited number of models in December 2006, including their flagship model, the Porsche Turbo RSR 934 Racing Edition, which was part of the early phase of Tamiya's RC career.

Radio-controlled model types have included:

 Countach Competition Special
 Super Champ
 Ford F-150 Ranger
 Toyota Hilux 4x4
 Chevrolet S-10
 Hilux 4x4 High-lift
 Mountaineer
 Ford F-350 High-lift
 Can-Am Lola Racing Master Mk.1
 Subaru BRAT
 Lancia Rally
 Grasshopper
 Mighty Frog
 Wild One
 Hornet
 Falcon
 Hotshot
 Boomerang
 Fast Attack Vehicle
 Desert Gator
 Sand Viper
 Avante
 Avante 2001
 Top Force
 Dyna Storm
 Dark Impac
 Keen Hawk
 Avante Mk. II
 Twin Detonator
 Wild Dagger
 Double Blaze
 Blackfoot Xtreme
 Clod Buster
 TXT1
 Tamtech Series
 Terra Crusher
 TNX (Tamiya)
 TNX 5.2R
 Nitrage 5.2
 Bigwig
 Fox
 Monster Beetle
 Celica
 Porsche 959 Paris-Dakar Rall
 Blackfoot
 Midnight Pumpkin
 Super Shot
 Super Sabre
 Striker
 Sonic Fighter
 Lunch Box
 Nissan King Cab
 Wild Willy
 Wild Willy 2
 Farm King
 Tumbling Bull
 Big Wig
 TRF 416X
 TRF 417
 TRF 417X
 Nissan R91CP
 Mazda 787B
 Mercedes C-11
 Jaguar XJR-12
 Sand Scorcher
 TRF 201
 Rising Fighter
 TT-01 series

The TRF 416X, TRF 417, and TRF 417X models can be fitted with a Hydrogen Fuel Cell with the H-Cell 2.0 product, making this one of the only (if not the only) professional quality, hydrogen powered model car. The manufacturer claims enhanced run times of over 4 hours on a single hydrogen charge.

Mini four-wheel drives
Ford Ranger 4x4 (July 13, 1982: Mini 4WD) – An early Mini 4WD, released at the same time as the Chevrolet Pickup 4x4.
Hotshot Jr. (June 16, 1986: Racing Mini 4WD) – An early Racing Mini 4WD.
Avante Jr (December 15, 1988: Racing Mini 4WD) – Said to be the first appearance of a mini 4WD for serious racing use.
Sonic Saber (September 7, 1994: Fully Cowled Mini 4WD) – An early Fully Cowled machine, released at the same time as the Magnum Saber.
Nitro Thunder (November 18, 2005: Mini 4WD PRO) – An early Mini 4WD PRO, released at the same time as Nitro Force.
Aero Avante (July 14, 2012: Mini 4WD REV) – An early Mini 4WD REV, featuring a new, aerodynamic, and monocoque chassis design.
Lord Spirit (August 28, 2021: Laser Mini 4WD) – An early Laser Mini 4WD, featuring a chassis with removable front and rear bumpers, and special clear-colored parts to help with the car's stability.

They also produce very high end mini four-wheel drive models in the EVO chassis. These are chassis that have carbon fiber and aluminum components.

Other

Tamiya produces components for moving toys and models (such as their Fun Craft Series), and also produces kits to make simple robots. Another popular product is the older Mabuchi Motor, which runs in water.

In 1960, beginning with the Honda F1 (RA273), Tamiya dealt with many plastic models of Formula One (F1) racecars.

Since 1976's Tyrrell P34, Tamiya pays royalties to the teams whose cars their models were based on. Because of Tamiya's reputation for quality, they built strong relations with the teams, even to the point where the teams' well-guarded engineering designs (CAD data) were shown exclusively to Tamiya and no other model makers. However, recently this sort of arrangement has lessened, models are based on alternative references (like news photographs), and royalties demanded by F1 teams have risen. Thus, sales of new models have become more difficult in recent years. Other model companies have taken over the F1 market (such as Model Factory Hiro) and now have the connections that Tamiya used to have with current and past F1 teams.

Tamiya's 1:48 Mini Military AFV, complete even to the point where it was given weathering, aimed to expand the market for completed, painted models. In order to accommodate that, Tamiya employs about 1,200 workers to make finished die cast models which are then shipped to hobby markets around the world. In September 2000, policemen in Cebu City, Philippines began operations to arrest people betting on Tamiya toy car races, which they consider a form of illegal gambling.

Association with CAVE
In March 2005, Tamiya partnered with the game developer CAVE. In June of the same year, they started developing content for mobile phones. Coinciding with releasing the Mini 4WD PRO model car that November, the online game "Mini 4WD Online Racer" and corresponding website were announced. At first, the service schedule was for spring 2006, but because of delays, official service was postponed to summer 2007.

On February 1, 2006, Tamiya and CAVE established Mini 4WD Networks Co., Ltd., a spin-off business dealing with miniature vehicles. In July of the same year, the company began the "MINIon Club" service, a social networking site which also gave special deals on miniature vehicles.

Overseas subsidiaries
Internationally, Tamiya has several subsidiaries:
Tamiya America, Inc.
Tamiya Philippines, Inc.
Tamiya Hong Kong, LTD
Tamiya Europe, GmbH

Tamiya is a major shareholder of Creative Master Bermuda Limited, a Hong Kong-based contract manufacturer which includes Tamiya among its clients.

Facilities
Tamiya has several large regional divisions, notably in Irvine, California, home of Tamiya America, the North, Central, and South American branch responsible for many of the company's racing developments. Tamiya America also features a world-class racing facility in Aliso Viejo, California—which is the site of several world championship events—as well as an annual scale model contest called Tamiya/Con, the last of which was held in 2006.

Presently, over half of Tamiya's products are manufactured in Antipolo City, Philippines. An assembly plant is located in Mactan Export Processing Zone, Cebu, Philippines.

Tamiya Europe is located in Germany.

Guinness World Records
Tamiya radio-controlled models previously held two Guinness World Records, both for distances travelled:
Greatest distance by a radio-controlled model car on one set of batteries
 by David Stevens of Australia, Templestowe Flat Track Racing Club, Templestowe, Victoria, Australia on 20 April 2013. Car used: Tamiya F104 v2 with LRP 2S Lipo motor.
Greatest distance by a radio-controlled model car in 24 hours
 by students of Anna-Schmidt-Schule at a route between Hesse and Thuringia, Germany, on 24 July 2011, taking 14 hours and 50 minutes. Car used: Tamiya Desert Gator with LRP Quantum Bullet motor.
The school previously held the record for the single battery pack  at Tamiya Raceway Sonneberg in Sonneberg.

Gallery

See also
International Plastic Modellers' Society (IPMS)
AMPS, Armor Modeling and Preservation Society
Model military vehicle
Bakusou Kyoudai Let's & Go!!
Dash! Yonkuro
Mini 4WD
Model car
Tamiya Radio Controlled Nitro Vehicles

References

Books

External links

 

 
Companies based in Shizuoka Prefecture
Companies based in Aliso Viejo, California
Japanese brands
Toy companies established in 1946
Model manufacturers of Japan
Radio-controlled car manufacturers
Slot car manufacturers
Toy cars and trucks
Japanese companies established in 1946
Shizuoka (city)